Joseph Patrick Fox (20 January 1879 – 13 November 1948) was an  Australian rules footballer who played with South Melbourne and Geelong in the Victorian Football League (VFL).

Notes

External links 

1879 births
1948 deaths
Australian rules footballers from Victoria (Australia)
Sydney Swans players
Geelong Football Club players